Asarcogryllacris is an Asian genus of Orthopterans, sometimes known as 'leaf-folding crickets': in the subfamily Gryllacridinae and tribe Asarcogryllacridini.  Species have been recorded from Indochina and west Malesia.

Species 
The Orthoptera Species File lists:
Asarcogryllacris aequatorialis Gorochov, 2005
Asarcogryllacris anastomotica Karny, 1937
Asarcogryllacris brevis Ingrisch, 2018
Asarcogryllacris jambiensis Gorochov, 2005
Asarcogryllacris javaensis Gorochov, 2005
Asarcogryllacris kerinciensis Gorochov, 2005
Asarcogryllacris macilenta Pictet & Saussure, 1893 - type species(as Gryllacris macilentus Pictet & Saussure = A. macilenta macilenta from Java)
Asarcogryllacris maxima Gorochov, 2005
Asarcogryllacris minima Gorochov, 2005
Asarcogryllacris parapat Ingrisch, 2018
Asarcogryllacris robusta Ingrisch, 2018

References

External links

Ensifera genera
Gryllacrididae
Orthoptera of Indo-China
Orthoptera of Malesia